The Cock o' the North was a greyhound racing competition held annually at the White City Stadium Manchester and later Belle Vue Stadium in Manchester.

It was inaugurated in 1960 at the White City Stadium and was held annually until the track closed in 1981. The race switched to fellow Manchester track Belle Vue in 1982 but was discontinued after 2012.

Past winners

Venue 
1960-1981	(White City, Manchester)
1982-2005	(Belle Vue, 647m)
2006-2012	(Belle Vue, 670m)

Sponsors
1998-2009 Wafcol
2010-2012 C&T Bookmakers

References

Greyhound racing competitions in the United Kingdom
Sports competitions in Manchester
Recurring sporting events established in 1960